EFIS may refer to:

 electronic flight information system
 École Franco-Indienne Sishya, Adyar, Chennai, India; a French international school
 Estonian Foreign Intelligence Service
 Estonian Film Database (EFIS), part of the Estonian Film Foundation
 European Federation of Immunological Societies, publisher of the European Journal of Immunology

See also

 
 FIS (disambiguation)
 EFI (disambiguation)
 FI (disambiguation)